Murphy Lake is a lake in Iberville and Upper St. Martin Parishes, Louisiana, United States, within the Atchafalaya Basin. Murphy Lake lies at an elevation of 3 feet (1 m). It's 2 miles southeast of Natchitoches.

References

External links
 

Lakes of Louisiana